Champagne-sur-Oise is a railway station in the commune of Champagne-sur-Oise (Val-d'Oise department), France. The station is served by the Transilien H on two of its branches : Creil↔Persan-Beaumont↔Pontoise and Paris Nord↔Ermont Eaubonne↔Persan-Beaumont. In 2019, the station's estimated annual passengers is 342,276.

Bus connections

Keolis Val d'Oise: C

See also
List of SNCF stations in Île-de-France

References

External links
 

Railway stations in Val-d'Oise